Mindfield(s) or Mind Field(s) may refer to:

Music
 Mindfield (band), a German thrash metal band
 Mindfields, a 1999 album by Toto
 Mindfields (Morandi album), 2006
 "Mindfield" (song), a 1998 song by Ringo Starr from Vertical Man
 "Mindfields" (song), a 1997 song by The Prodigy from The Fat of the Land

Film and television
 Mind Field, a YouTube Premium series featuring educator Michael Stevens
 Mindfield (film), a 1989 Canadian film directed by Jean-Claude Lord
 Mind Field, a 2009 skateboarding video by Alien Workshop

Books
 Mind Fields, a 1994 book featuring paintings by Jacek Yerka and poems by Harlan Ellison
 Mindfield, a 2010 comic book by J. T. Krul